Ramsgate railway station serves the town of Ramsgate in Thanet in Kent, England, and is at least 10 minutes' walk from the town centre. The station is managed by Southeastern, which operates all trains serving it.

Architecture 
Ramsgate railway station is a 1920s brick-built station thought to have been designed by James Robb Scott and Edwin Maxwell Fry, and built between 1924 and 1926. Margate station and the demolished Dumpton Park station are of a similar design. The building is Grade II listed.

Services and facilities
All services at Ramsgate are operated by Southeastern using ,  and  EMUs.

The typical off-peak service in trains per hour is:
 1 tph to London St Pancras International via 
 1 tph to London St Pancras International via  and 
 1 tph to London St Pancras International via  and 
 1 tph to  via Chatham
 1 tph to London Charing Cross via Canterbury West and 
 1 tph to 

During the peak hours, the station is also served by trains to London Charing Cross and London Cannon Street via .

The station's facilities include waiting rooms, toilets, cafe, a ticket office (2 windows) and a ticket machine.

History

Trains first reached Ramsgate in April 1846 when the South Eastern Railway (SER) opened a line from Canterbury. It terminated at Ramsgate SER, later to be called Ramsgate Town, which, unlike the present-day station, was in the town centre. Later the same year the line opened across Thanet to Margate, to Margate SER (later Margate Sands). Trains from Canterbury to Margate had to reverse at Ramsgate Town; a chord was built bypassing the station, but not often used. St Lawrence station was opened in 1864 just before this chord, but closed in 1916.

The London Chatham & Dover Railway (LCDR) reached Margate from Herne Bay in 1863. This called at Margate LC&DR (later Margate West), East Margate (later Margate East), Broadstairs, and via a 1630 yd tunnel terminated at Ramsgate LC&DR (later Ramsgate Harbour), near the harbour and beach.

This arrangement was inherited by Southern Railway on grouping in 1923. In 1926 a new line was opened connecting the SER line from east of Ramsgate Town to the LCDR line just south of Broadstairs. The current Ramsgate station and a new station at Dumpton Park were built on this new line. The Ramsgate Harbour station, line through the tunnel, and the Ramsgate Town station and old SER line across to Margate Sands were all closed in July 1926. This change made for operational convenience, but has the disadvantage that the town centre is no longer served.

Motive power depot

The SER opened a motive power depot near Ramsgate Station in April 1846. This was closed by the Southern Railway in 1926 and replaced by a larger facility in 1930. This closed to steam locomotives in 1959 and was converted for use servicing electric multiple units introduced by the Southern Region following the British Railways Kent Coast Electrification.

The depot was modernised in 2007 and opened in late 2008.

References

External links 

Glasspool, David. Ramsgate – history of Ramsgate station and railway
Glasspool, David. Ramsgate MPD – history of Ramsgate rolling stock depot
Glasspool, David. Ramsgate Maintenance Depot – post 2007 depot description

Ramsgate
Railway stations in Kent
DfT Category D stations
Former Southern Railway (UK) stations
Railway stations in Great Britain opened in 1926
Railway stations served by Southeastern
James Robb Scott buildings
Grade II listed buildings in Kent
Grade II listed railway stations